The Indian Voter ID Card (officially the Elector's Photo Identity Card (EPIC)) is an identity document issued by the Election Commission of India to adult domiciles of India who have reached the age of 18, which primarily serves as an identity proof for Indian citizens while casting their ballot in the country's municipal, state, and national elections. It also serves as general identity, address, and age proof for other purposes such as buying a mobile phone SIM card or applying for a passport. It also serves as a Travel Document to travel to Nepal and Bhutan by Land or Air It is also known as Electors Photo Identity Card (EPIC). It was first introduced in 1993 during the tenure of the Chief Election Commissioner T. N. Seshan.

Physical appearance
Initially, voter IDs were printed with black ink on regular paper and laminated. Starting in 2015, the Indian government started rolling out a less perishable PVC colour version, compliant with the ISO/IEC 7810 size standard used by most payment and ATM cards.

On the front, the Elector Photo Identity Card contains the voter's name, the name of a relative they have chosen (such as their father or mother), and the voter's picture, along with the voter's ID number. On the back of the card, the voter's home address is printed, along with an image of their Electoral Registration Officer's signature. The back also mentions the voter's electoral district and their assembly constituency. The newer series also contains a 'part number', which lets voters and election officials locate voters on their electoral roll.

Obtaining voter card

The voter card is issued to all Indian citizens who have attained the age of 18 years and qualify to be a voter. One has to apply on prescribed Form-6 of Election Commission attached with proof of ID, Indian nationality, age and residence.

Those of "unsound mind", convicted of "corrupt practices", or offenses related to elections are ineligible to vote.

Applicants have to submit paper Form-6 to their Booth Level officer (BLO) of the area.

Applicants can also apply online on the website of the chief electoral officer given for that State or can directly apply to the website named National Voter Service Portal (NVSP).

New Application and Correction
Applying for Voter ID or make changes in existing Voter ID is also possible online via NVS Portal. Online process is more convenient than offline process. Correction to existing voter ID can be done via NVS Portal using EPIC number. [17] Voter Helpline App also can be used for online application.[16] Applicant does not have to visit the electoral office and online tracking of application status also possible. Online application process is quicker than offline process. Online ways made the process more simpler than ever

Fake and defunct voter cards
Fake voter ID cards have occasionally been used fraudulently for other purposes by dubious parties and individuals to suit their personal needs.

Validity
If a person moves his/her residence to another assembly/parliamentary constituency then he/she does not remain a valid voter of the previous constituency. The person has to register afresh as voter in the new assembly constituency. Hence a new card is issued to him/her and the old card becomes invalid.

Voting in India is a right, not a duty and hence the voter's identity card remains valid even after not casting ballot continuously in consecutive elections.

See also
Aadhaar
Aadhaar-enabled service delivery

References

Electoral reform in India
Elections in India
Identity documents of India